Lysandros Georgamlis (born 25 February 1962) is a Greek former international football player who played as a defender and a manager.

Club career
Georgamlis started his football career in 1974, from the youth team of AEK Athens and was a member of an exceptional generation of talented footballers who were promoted to the first team in 1979, together with Stelios Manolas and Vangelis Vlachos. He then became a professional and a key member of the team's squad. He played in the positions of right back, sweeper and defensive midfielder, he had blocking and organizing abilities in his game and a very strong shot. He had a very good presence with the "yellow-black" jersey and was very loved by the people of the team. He played a great match in the Cup final against PAOK in 1983, winning the trophy by 2–0.

In December 1985, his contract expired and as he did not get along with the administration of Zafiropoulos he decided to sign for Panathinaikos. During his spell at the "greens" he won three Greek Championships, four Greek Cups, one Greek Super Cup at a time when the team also had successful runs in European Competitions. In 1992, he joined OFI, offering his service to the club for two seasons. After a short stay at Kalamata he joined Iraklis in 1995 and a year later Ethnikos Piraeus. In February 1999 he signed to Athinaikos and with the end of the season in the summer of the same year, he ended his football career.

International career
Georgamlis also competed 6 times with Greece from 1987 to 1988. He made his debut on 16 December 1987 in the home match in Rhodes against Netherlands, when under the instructions of Miltos Papapostolou he played the whole match. His last appearance came almost ten months later, on 19 October 1988, in the home match against Denmark, where he came on as a substitute replacing Tasos Mitropoulos.

Managerial career
After the end of his football career, Georgamlis attended all HFF coaching courses available and got his professional coach diploma, including the UEFA Pro. His coaching career started from Attalos Nea Filadelfeia in 1999. In 2003, he joined Thrasyvoulos, where he stayed for three years helping the club to be promoted from the 3rd to the 2nd Division. In the season 1996–97 he won the 3rd Division Championship with Asteras Tripolis and then joined Panetolikos, Ethnikos Piraeus, Ilisiakos and Fostiras. In November 2008, Georgamlis became the assistant coach of AEK Athens next to Dušan Bajević. In June 2012, Georgamlis, again next to Bajević, became the assistant coach of Atromitos.

Honours

AEK Athens 
Greek Cup: 1982–83

Panathinaikos
Alpha Ethniki: 1985–86, 1989–90, 1990–91
Greek Cup: 1985–86, 1987–88, 1985–89, 1990–91
Greek Super Cup: 1988

References

External links

1962 births
Living people
Greece international footballers
Association football defenders
Super League Greece players
AEK Athens F.C. players
AEK F.C. non-playing staff
Iraklis Thessaloniki F.C. players
Kalamata F.C. players
Panathinaikos F.C. players
OFI Crete F.C. players
Ethnikos Piraeus F.C. players
Athinaikos F.C. players
Greek beach soccer players
Panetolikos F.C. managers
Greek football managers
Footballers from Athens
Greek footballers